Parkyn may refer to:

Benjamin Parkyn Richardson (1857–1910), member of the first North-West Legislative Assembly in Northwest Territories, Canada
Bill Parkyn, American scientist
Brian Parkyn (1923–2006), British Labour Party politician
Richard Parkyn (1772–1853), champion Cornish wrestler
Robert Parkyn (1862–1939), popular municipal and provincial level politician and tradesman in Calgary, Alberta, Canada

See also 
Parkyns